Longgang District is a district of Huludao, Liaoning, People's Republic of China. It is by far the smallest division of Huludao City with an area of just , and along with Lianshan District is one of the two districts within which Huludao city itself is situated.

Longgang district encompasses the new district of Huludao city, and includes Longbeishan Park, Longwan Beach, Wanghai Temple and the Huludao shipyard within its boundaries.

Administrative Divisions
There are 10 subdistricts within the district.

Subdistricts:
Shuanglong Subdistrict, East Subdistrict, West Subdistrict, Binhai Subdistrict, Wanghaisi Subdistrict, Huludao Subdistrict, Longwan Subdistrict, Beigang Subdistrict, Lianwan Subdistrict, Yuhuang Subdistrict

References

External links

County-level divisions of Liaoning
Huludao